Culina Group Limited is a British food and drinks logistics company based in Market Drayton, Shropshire. It owns a number of other brands, including Eddie Stobart Group, and is a wholly owned subsidiary of Müller Group.

History
The company was established as a haulage business in Market Drayton in 1994. It merged with Bayliss Transport, a third party logistics operator, in 2008, and acquired Great Bear Distribution in 2016. The business entered into a joint venture with Warren Warehousing Group in 2018 and bought Robsons (of Spalding) in 2018. It then purchased Fowler Welch from Dart Group in June 2020. After that it acquired GreenWhiteStar Acquisitions (the holding company of the Eddie Stobart Group) in July 2021.

Gallery

See also
Müller (company)
Eddie Stobart Group

References

External links
 Culina Group website

Transport operators of the United Kingdom
Logistics companies of the United Kingdom
Companies based in Shropshire